Mike Baird (born 1968) is an Australian investment banker and a former politician who was the 44th Premier of New South Wales.
 
Mike Baird may also refer to:
 
 Mike Baird (musician) (born 1951), American drummer
 "Mike Baird" (song), by Tom Budin, 2016

See also
 Michael Baird (soccer) (born 1983), Australian soccer player striker